Braddock Road in the City of Alexandria runs northwestward from West Street near the Braddock Road Metro station to the Alexandria campus of the Northern Virginia Community College, just beyond Beauregard Street.

History
Braddock Road was originally composed of paths established by the Native American inhabitants of Northern Virginia.  Later, British colonialists and Virginian governments developed and improved the paths into what became known as "Braddock's Road."

Colonial and revolutionary era

Civil War
During the American Civil War, both Union and Confederate troops traversed Braddock Road during various battles in Fairfax County and other parts of Northern Virginia.

External links
The Many Lives of Braddock Road, from The Roads of Northern Virginia

Transportation in Alexandria, Virginia
Roads in Virginia